Foot voting is expressing one's preferences through one's actions, by voluntarily participating in or withdrawing from an activity, group, or process; especially, physical migration to leave a situation one does not like, or to move to a situation one regards as more beneficial. People who engage in foot voting are said to "vote with their feet".

Legal scholar Ilya Somin has described foot voting as "a tool for enhancing political freedom: the ability of the people to choose the political regime under which they wish to live". Communist leader Vladimir Lenin commented, "They voted with their feet," regarding Russian soldiers deserting the army of the Tsar. The concept has also been associated with Charles Tiebout, who pioneered the concept (although he did not use the term "foot voting") in a 1956 paper, and with Ronald Reagan, who advocated migration between states of the United States as a solution to unsatisfactory local conditions.

Law and politics 
Legal scholar Ilya Somin has argued that foot voting requires far less information (on the part of the citizens engaging in it) to be exercised effectively than does literal voting at the ballot box; that foot voters are more strongly motivated to acquire relevant information than are ballot-box voters; and that decentralized federalism promotes the welfare of citizens because it facilitates foot voting. Somin has also used foot voting to make a case for changes in international law to allow easier migration across international borders. Legal scholars Roderick M. Hills, Jr., and Shitong Qiao have used China as a case study to argue that foot voting is ineffective unless meaningful ballot-box voting is also in place. Somin has rebutted this critique.

Culture 
Models from theoretical biology have been applied to elucidate the causal relationships between foot voting and the dissemination of human cultural characteristics.

Examples

United States 
One of the clearest examples of foot voting is the mass exodus of movers out of California to other states. In 2020, 650,000 people left California, a net loss of 135,000 people. Some of the motivations spurring people to move out of California and to other states are the pursuit of lower taxes, more affordable housing, and fewer regulations on businesses.

Conversely, an example of a movement of people moving to a place rather than from a place is the Free State Project. The Free State Project (FSP) is an American political migration movement founded in 2001 to recruit at least 20,000 libertarians to move to a single low-population state (New Hampshire, was selected in 2003) in order to make the state a stronghold for libertarian ideas.  By concentrating on a single state rather than being dispersed over several states, libertarians have seen a lot of electoral wins in New Hampshire. For example, 150 representatives in the NH state house were ranked as an A- or above by the New Hampshire Liberty Alliance in 2021.  As of March of 2022, approximately 6,232 participants have moved to New Hampshire for the Free State Project.

See also 

 Dollar voting
 Exit, Voice, and Loyalty
 Free State Project
 Human capital flight
 Jurisdiction shopping
 Panarchism
 Revealed preference
 Tiebout model
 Freedom of movement
 Illegal emigration
 Republikflucht

References 

Voting theory
Psephology
Internal migration